, is a fee-free commercial terrestrial television station serving Shiga Prefecture of Japan.  It was started broadcasting in 1972. 

It is a member of the Japanese Association of Independent Television Stations (JAITS, Popular name Independent UHF Station).  On Octomber 2006, Biwako Broadcasting starts digital TV broadcasting.

Offices
The head office - 16–1, Tsurunosato, Ōtsu, Shiga Prefecture
Hikone office - K1 Building, 1-3-1, Kyomachi, Hikone, Shiga Prefecture
Tokyo office - Posco Tokyo Building (4th floor), 7-11-14, Ginza, Chūō, Tokyo
Osaka office - Umeda Shiga Building (12th floor), 1-1-49, Umeda, Kita-ku, Osaka

History
May 22, 1971 - Biwako Broadcasting Co., Ltd. is founded.
April 1, 1972 - BBC starts to broadcast.
October 1, 2006 - BBC starts digital TV broadcasting.
July 24, 2011 - BBC ends analog TV broadcasting

Stations
Analog - JOBL-TV (as of 7/24/11 end date)
Otsu (Mt. Usa) - Channel 30
Hikone - Channel 56
Kōsei - Channel 53

Digital - JOBL-DTV
Remote controller ID: 3
Otsu (Mt. Usa) - Channel 20
Hikone - Channel 29
Kōsei - Channel 29
Otsu Ishiyama - Channel 20
Otsu Fujio - Channel 20
Yōkaichi - Channel 48
Kōka Ohara - Channel 29
Otsu Yamanaka - Channel 20
Shigaraki - Channel 52
Takatsuki Takano - Channel 45

Program
 - News
 - Information variety show
 - Disaster measures information
 - Regional variety show
 - Economic news
and more

See also
UHF (Independent UHF Station)
Chunichi Shimbun, Shiga Bank - large stockholders

References

External links
Official Website (Japanese)

Independent television stations in Japan
Television stations in Japan
Television channels and stations established in 1971
Mass media in Ōtsu